Daughtry  is an American rock band formed and fronted by namesake Chris Daughtry, who was a finalist on the fifth season of American Idol. Their self-titled debut album was released in November 2006 and reached number one on the Billboard 200. The album went on to sell more than six million copies in the United States, and has been certified six times platinum by the RIAA. Daughtry was also named the best selling album of 2007 by Billboard, becoming the fastest-selling debut rock album in Nielsen SoundScan history. The album produced four top 20 hits on the Billboard Hot 100, including top five hits "It's Not Over" and "Home".

The band's second album, Leave This Town, was released in July 2009 and debuted at number one on the Billboard 200 chart, becoming Daughtry's second number one album in the United States. To date, Leave This Town has sold over 1.3 million copies in the United States and has been certified platinum by the RIAA. The album's lead single, "No Surprise", became the band's fifth top 20 hit on the Hot 100. Their third studio album, Break the Spell, was released in November 2011 and debuted within the top 10 on the Billboard 200 chart. The album has been certified Gold by the RIAA. Daughtry's fourth studio album, Baptized, was released in November 2013, and debuted at number six on the Billboard 200 chart, selling approximately 90,000 units. They released their fifth and sixth albums, Cage to Rattle and Dearly Beloved, in July 2018 and September 2021, respectively. To date, Daughtry has sold over 9 million albums and over 25.6 million digital tracks in the U.S.

History

2005–08: Daughtry and breakthrough success
Chris Daughtry, who finished in fourth place on the fifth season of American Idol in 2006, stated that he would form a new band after turning down Fuel's offer to make him their lead singer. On July 10, 2006, Chris Daughtry had signed with RCA Records and 19 Recordings, which held contracts with fellow American Idol contestants such as Kelly Clarkson and Clay Aiken, and among others. Chris Daughtry is a singer-songwriter himself and has collaborated with several other songwriters, such as Live's Ed Kowalczyk, Seether's Shaun Morgan, Goo Goo Dolls's John Rzeznik, Fuel's Carl Bell, 3 Doors Down's Brad Arnold, Matchbox Twenty's Rob Thomas, SR-71's Mitch Allan, Shinedown's Brent Smith, Three Days Grace's Adam Gontier, and the former The Click Five singer Eric Dill, Theory of a Deadman's Tyler Connolly, Lifehouse's Jason Wade and Nickelback's Chad Kroeger.

Daughtry and members of his label held auditions. Ultimately, they chose four members for the band: Jeremy Brady, 21, guitarist (no longer in the band); Josh Steely, 36, lead guitarist; Josh Paul (no longer with the band), 29, bassist who played for Suicidal Tendencies; Joey Barnes, 30, drummer, (no longer with the band). Two of the band members hail from North Carolina – Barnes, whom Chris had known for some time, and Brady, who was introduced to him a month before the audition. Steely and Paul are both from California. The decision was made to name the band "Daughtry" in order to keep name recognition. In an interview, Chris Daughtry said, "We could have come out with a really obscure name, but coming from a TV show and having name recognition, it was easier just to go with my last name."

The band's self-titled debut album was produced by Howard Benson and was released by RCA Records on November 21, 2006. Chris Daughtry wrote and co-wrote all but two songs on the album – "Feels Like Tonight" and "What About Now". Other notable songwriters Dr. Luke and Max Martin contributed to the album, and session drummer Josh Freese played on all tracks. However, at the time the album was recorded, Chris was the only official member of the band, leading some to mistakenly believe that the band Daughtry is his solo career.

Daughtry was an instant success and spawned several hits for the group, starting with its first single "It's Not Over", which debuted on the radio on December 6, 2006, after being delayed from a planned September release and reaching number four on the Billboard Hot 100 and hitting the top 3 in several other charts.  Shortly thereafter, Jeremy Brady departed and was replaced with Brian Craddock, 31, from Virginia. In interviews, Chris Daughtry and Craddock have discussed having known each other when Chris Daughtry was still a member of Absent Element.

After the success of "It's Not Over," the second single from the album, "Home" was released and peaked at number five on the Billboard Hot 100, after debuting at number 83, weeks ahead of its official release to radio. The song was also the official "kick-off" song on sixth season of American Idol, played after a contestant was voted off the show, also the case during season five of Australian Idol. The Brazilian version of Idol, called Ídolos Brazil, used this song as well in its second season.  The album's third single, "What I Want", was released to rock radio on April 23, 2007, featuring musician Slash on lead guitars. The single has peaked at number 6 on the rock charts and is featured as a playable song on Guitar Hero: On Tour for the Nintendo DS. The band's fourth single "Over You" was released on July 24, 2007. The band performed this single live on Good Morning America on June 1, 2007.  "Crashed", the album's fifth single, was released to rock stations on September 10, 2007, where it was also used in a commercial for Lego Bionicle. The song was also performed on the Pre-Race show on ABC for the NASCAR NEXTEL Cup Chevy Rock and Roll 400. The album's sixth single, "Feels Like Tonight", was released on January 8, 2008, just over a year after the album's release. The video debuted in January and the song was used for the 2007 WWE Tribute to the Troops. Their song "There and Back Again" was also the official theme song for WWE Backlash in 2007.

Due to the success of the singles, Daughtry was certified 4× Platinum on April 24, 2008. The group is on page 8 on Myspace.com of the most played artists, with over 29 million plays. In addition, the group has appeared on the famous compilation album series Now That's What I Call Music! five times, with their songs "It's Not Over", "Home", "Over You", "Feels Like Tonight" and "What About Now". The band was also nominated for four Grammy Awards in 2008, for Best Pop Performance by a Duo or Group with Vocal, Best Rock Album, Best Rock Song and Best Rock Performance by a Duo or Group with Vocal. According to billboard.com, Daughtry has had twenty number one hits around the world.

A deluxe edition of Daughtry's self-titled album was released on September 9, 2008. Along with the original CD, this expanded CD/DVD package features four bonus tracks, including acoustic versions of "What About Now," "It's Not Over", and "Home", plus a cover of Foreigner's "Feels Like the First Time". The DVD contains all five of Daughtry's music videos, two rarely seen live clips, and exclusive behind-the-scenes tour footage.

A shortened version of their massive hit single "Home" was used at the end of the English League Cup Final in February 2008 when the compilation of Tottenham Hotspur victory over Chelsea was shown at the end of the Sky coverage.

2009–10: Leave This Town
The second album, Leave This Town was released on July 14, 2009, with fourteen songs making the cut from the nineteen recorded songs. Chris said that the record is a very big rock album. He has also stated that the band had written and recorded over thirty new songs. He worked with Chad Kroeger from Nickelback, Ryan Tedder from OneRepublic, Trevor McNevan from Thousand Foot Krutch, Jason Wade from Lifehouse, Richard Marx, Scott Stevens from The Exies, Adam Gontier, former vocalist for Three Days Grace and Eric Dill, former vocalist for The Click Five.

The album's first single, "No Surprise", was released on May 5, 2009, through their website. It officially went for radio play on May 26. Daughtry appeared on American Idol on May 6, 2009 (which is the Result Show of season 8's 'Rock Week') performing  "No Surprise". "Life After You" was the follow-up single to "No Surprise".

Leave This Town debuted at number one on the Billboard 200 selling 269,000 copies in its first week. The record was also number one on the Digital Albums Chart and the Rock Chart.

After Leave This Town was released, Daughtry became the first American Idol artist to have two consecutive number-one albums. Carrie Underwood later achieved this accolade when her albums Carnival Ride (2007) and Play On (2009) went number one.

Daughtry performed on-stage at the American Music Awards on November 22, 2009, and sang their hit single "Life After You".

On November 10, 2009, USA Today revealed that Daughtry band members Chris Daughtry and Brian Craddock co-wrote "Don't Wanna Be Wrong", an iTunes Deluxe bonus track on Allison Iraheta's debut album, Just Like You.

On March 16, 2010, the band released a B-side of the single from the album, Leave This Town with five songs that were with the pre-order only, or never came out with the album.

On April 16, 2010, drummer Joey Barnes and the band had parted ways. Robin Diaz was tapped to replace him for the band's ongoing tour.

"September" was the third single from Leave This Town and it peaked at number two on HAC radio charts, number eighteen on Pop radio charts and number 36 on the Billboard Hot 100 chart.
The band has also released an extended play titled Leave This Town: The B-Sides, which contains the bonus tracks from Leave This Town.

2011–12: Break the Spell
The band's third album, Break the Spell was released on November 21, 2011. They released the song "Drown in You" for the soundtrack to Batman: Arkham City.

Break the Spell debuted at number eight on the Billboard Top 200 on November 28, 2011, with 129,000 copies sold. As of January 2012 the album has sold 407,000 copies in the United States. On January 26, "Crawling Back to You" debuted at number twenty-four on the Japan Hot 100. "Renegade", "Crawling Back to You" and "Outta My Head" are the three singles released from the album. The fourth single "Start of Something Good" was released on September 4, 2012.

Daughtry commemorated Memorial Day with a performance of "Home" on the West Lawn of the U.S. Capitol in Washington, D.C. at PBS' National Memorial Day Concert on May 27, 2012.

On May 28, the band was back in the studio, and on May 29, he said that they were back in the studio, and cannot reveal what they are doing but it is exciting. They were recording an acoustic version of "Rescue Me" for DC Comics efforts in Africa. The proceeds of the acoustic version will go to the efforts in Africa.

On September 24, 2012, the band released a statement on its website that Josh Paul had decided to leave the band. Paul said, "The time has come for me to bow out and let the band continue on without me. This has been a very difficult decision, as these are not only my band mates, but my brothers."

2013–2016: Baptized and It's Not Over...The Hits So Far
During Daughtry's two days of writing for the album, they worked with Matt Thiessen, wrote with Blair Daly, and Espionage

On March 27, 2013, Daughtry tweeted that they had been working with Martin Johnson of Boys Like Girls. and Rock Mafia; On May 6, Daughtry worked with Scott Stevens; on May 7, worked with Ali Tamposi; on May 8, worked with Tamposi and The Monsters and the Strangerz; On May 14, Daughtry tweeted that he was back in the studio with Martin Johnson and Sam Hollander The following day, Daughtry tweeted that he was cutting vocals for the album. On May 17, Chris Daughtry tweeted that Josh Paul had rejoined the band. On May 22, 2013, Chris Daughtry played a new song that he wrote for the new album titled "Broken Arrows". Chris said that they hope to have the first single out by the end of the year and the entire record out by February 2014.

On August 23, Chris said that he had the new album title and that the fans will hear the new single very soon, along with more details to come. On September 4, Daughtry posted a segment of their new single cover, and on September 5, Daughtry posted new lyrics 'She's talking to angels, counting the stars', Also on September 7, Daughtry posted more of their single cover, showing the opposite side of the image. On September 8, Chris tweeted more lyrics 'She's just watching the clouds roll by and they spell her name.'

There was a contest to reveal their new single; unfortunately, on September 12, it was leaked by someone from RCA Records that the new single is "Waiting for Superman", which was released on September 17.  Their fourth album called Baptized became available November 19, 2013.

The band performed on the 2013 Dick Clark's New Year's Rockin' Eve with Ryan Seacrest.

On May 21, 2014, Daughtry and Robin Diaz parted ways due to scheduling conflicts.

A greatest hits album, It's Not Over...The Hits So Far, was released on February 12, 2016, with singles from their studio albums and two new songs. On January 29, 2016, "Torches" was released as the lead single.

2016–2018: Cage to Rattle
On April 20, 2016, Chris Daughtry posted a video on Instagram of him tracking guitar. Chris has also posted pictures of him in the studio recording vocals. He said that the new album will be more rock focused saying that "It's not such a dramatic departure from what we did on the first three albums, as opposed to the last record, where it was very pop-driven production." On May 21, 2016, while performing at the O2 Academy in Birmingham, Chris said: "I regret to inform you that other than the two songs that's on the greatest hits we don't have anything new to play yet. However I do promise you this, we are working on the fifth album and there are guitars on it. Take that how you want, but it is a rock record so ..." As of May 31, the band is currently in the tracking process of their next album at Blackbird Studios in Nashville, Tennessee according to Chris' Instagram. On June 25, they performed a new song that is supposed to be on the next record called "Backbone" during the Feed the Machine tour with Nickelback at Frederik Meijer Gardens & Sculpture Park in Grand Rapids Charter Township, Michigan.

On March 30, 2018, Daughtry released their new single "Backbone", the lead single from their upcoming fifth studio album, Cage to Rattle. The first official single from Cage to Rattle was "Deep End," and the album was released on July 27, 2018.

2019–present: The Masked Singer, label change, and Dearly Beloved
In September 2019, Daughtry and RCA, their record label since 2006, decided to split ways. The split was due to contract fulfillment, wanting to part ways. On the spilt Daughtry said, "We've always been a rock band. And when you're dealing with a major label, there's always that pressure of needing to turn in hits and needing to cater to a certain format, and I didn't want to do that anymore."

On November 20, 2019, Chris Daughtry revealed via his Instagram that Daughtry had started to record their sixth studio album and had teamed up with producer Scott Stevens.

On December 18, 2019, Chris Daughtry was revealed to be the "Rottweiler" in the second season of The Masked Singer. He performed "Alive" by Sia on the finale, and it was released as a single by the band.

On August 10, 2020, Daughtry announced that while they are working on a new album, the COVID-19 pandemic halted the band's recording process. It was also rumored Daughtry has signed with Warner Music Group. It was later revealed that while Daughtry is now independent, their distribution falls under Warner Music.

On August 13, 2020, Daughtry released their single "World on Fire." On March 18, 2021, they released a new single titled "Heavy Is the Crown." On May 28, the band released a cover version of the band Temple of the Dog's song "Hunger Strike" featuring Lajon Witherspoon.

The band's sixth studio album, Dearly Beloved, was released on September 17, 2021. Music Historian's Jarred & Jordon Boyko, which were both in studio with Daughtry during recording, stated in their most recent publication of LGBTQ North Carolina that they expect Daughtry's sixth album will “unite the citizens of North & South Carolina with its beautiful melodies yet hardcore harmonies” & that they would be renewing their wedding vows in Vegas very shortly. Along with the announcement of the album the band released the song, "Lioness".

On January 16, 2022, Josh Paul announced in a Instagram post that he was leaving the band once again.

On January 5, 2023, the band released a cover of Journey's 1983 hit "Separate Ways (Worlds Apart)", featuring guest vocals from Halestorm frontwoman Lzzy Hale.

Band name
Daughtry is often mistakenly believed to be Chris Daughtry's solo project. However, in a manner similar to Bon Jovi, Dio, Dokken and Van Halen, Daughtry is a band, taking Chris Daughtry's surname as their moniker. In an interview, Daughtry explained, "We could've come out with a really obscure name, but coming from the TV show and having name recognition, it was easier just to go with my last name." He also joked, "Steel Dragon would have been great."

Discography

Daughtry (2006)
Leave This Town (2009)
Break the Spell (2011)
Baptized (2013)
Cage to Rattle (2018)
Dearly Beloved (2021)

Tours
The band has been touring non-stop since January 2007. They have performed across the U.S. and Canada, along with shows in the UK, Germany, and Singapore. They opened for Nickelback for a brief stint, Puddle of Mudd, and Finger Eleven and have featured 12 Stones, Cinder Road, Small Town Sleeper, Day of Fire and Eve To Adam as opening acts. On May 27, 2007, the band performed during the Indianapolis 500 Pre-Race show on ABC, and headlined the 2007 Summerfest at the Marcus amphitheater in Milwaukee, Wisconsin with a crowd of more than 15,000 on July 6.
Daughtry has played shows in Australia, as well as the United Kingdom and across Europe for the first time and opened for Bon Jovi for several shows in November. They were featured as the opening act during Bon Jovi's Lost Highway Tour. The band began a sold-out tour with Bon Jovi on February 18, 2008, all the way through the end of April. Chris Daughtry joined Bon Jovi onstage many nights to perform their song, "Blaze of Glory". 
 
On Thanksgiving 2009, Daughtry performed the halftime show for the Dallas Cowboys vs. Oakland Raiders football game to kick off the Salvation Army Red Kettle campaign.

Daughtry's second leg of the Leave This Town Tour started on March 18, 2010, in Baltimore and continued through June.

From March 20 to August 18, 2012, Daughtry went on their second headlining tour, the Break the Spell Tour across North America with openers SafetySuit and Mike Sanchez. The tour supported their third studio album 'Break the Spell'. The band played at small theaters and one arena.

Daughtry and 3 Doors Down co-headlined a nineteen date tour in the United States from November 17 to December 15, 2012. On December 10, 2012, more dates were added, extending the tour to February 26, 2013. On October 12, 2012, Daughtry toured Europe with shows in Russia. Daughtry opened up for Nickelback once again on their Feed the Machine Tour starting June 2017. 
 
Headlining
Leave This Town Tour (2009–10)
Break the Spell Tour (2012)
Baptized World Tour (2014)
Greatest Hits Tour'' (2016)
Cage to Rattle Tour (2018–19
Dearly Beloved Tour (2021–22)

Co-headlining
Bigger than Life Tour (2012–13)) 
Daughtry/Goo Goo Dolls Summer Tour (2014) 

Supporting
Lost Highway Tour (2008) 
Dark Horse Tour (2010) 
Feed the Machine Tour (2017)

Band members

Chris Daughtry – lead vocals, third guitar , rhythm guitar , lead guitar 
Josh Steely – lead guitar, backing vocals 
Brian Craddock – rhythm and lead guitar, backing vocals 
Elvio Fernandes – keyboards, occasional rhythm guitar, backing vocals 
Brandon Maclin – drums 

Touring members

Andy Waldeck – bass, backing vocals (2012–2013, 2022)
Marty O'Brien – bass (2022–present)

Former members
Jeremy Brady – rhythm guitar, backing vocals 
Joey Barnes – drums, backing vocals 
Robin Diaz – drums 
Josh Paul – bass, backing vocals 

Former touring musicians
Jamal Moore – drums

Timeline

Awards and nominations

American Music Awards

Billboard Awards

BMI Pop Awards
The BMI Pop Awards are accolades presented annually by Broadcast Music, Inc., honouring songwriters, composers, and music publishers in various genres. Daughtry has received 7 BMI awards.

|-
| 2008 || "Home" || Best Pop|| 
|-
| 2008 || "It's Not Over" || Best Pop || 
|-
| 2009 || "Feels Like Tonight" || Best Pop || 
|-
| 2009 || "Over You" || Best Pop || 
|-
| 2010 || "No Surprise" || Best Pop || 
|-
| 2010 || "What About Now" || Best Pop || 
|-
| 2011 || "Life After You" || Best Pop || 
|-

Grammy

Other

References

External links 

[ Daughtry] at Billboard.com

American pop rock music groups
American post-grunge musical groups
Musical groups established in 2006
19 Recordings artists
RCA Records artists
Warner Music Group artists